Bicyclus neustetteri is a butterfly in the family Nymphalidae. It is found in the Democratic Republic of the Congo and Uganda.

References

Elymniini
Butterflies described in 1914